Frederick Burr (1887–1915) was an English cricketer.

Frederick Burr may also refer to:
Fred Burr (1911–2006), Canadian politician

See also
Frederick Burr Opper (1857–1937), American newspaper comic strip cartoonist